The Symphony in E minor, Op. 7, Rebirth, is the only symphony written by Polish composer Mieczysław Karłowicz. Work on the symphony began in 1899 during the composer's studies in Berlin, and was finished in 1902 in Poland. It received its world premiere in 1903 in Berlin, and its Polish premiere the same year in Lwów.

Instrumentation
The symphony is written for 3 flutes (third doubling piccolo), 2 oboes, 2 clarinets, 2 bassoons, 4 horns, 2 trumpets, 3 trombones, tuba, timpani, and strings.

Structure
It is divided into four movements:
 Andante - Allegro
 Andante non troppo 
 Vivace
 Allegro Maestoso

References

External links
 

1902 compositions
Compositions in E minor
Karlowicz